Almè is a comune (municipality) in the Province of Bergamo in the Italian region Lombardy, located about  northeast of Milan and about  northwest of Bergamo.

Almè borders the following municipalities: Almenno San Bartolomeo, Almenno San Salvatore, Paladina, Sorisole, Villa d'Almè.
Part of Almè's territory is included in the  Parco dei Colli di Bergamo, and is crossed by river Quisa.

References

External links
 Official website